Eurytides agesilaus neosilaus, the short-lined kite swallowtail, is a subspecies of butterfly in the family Papilionidae. It is found in Mexico and Central America. The subspecies was first described by Carl Heinrich Hopffer in 1866. Specimens are sold commercially to collectors.

References

Eurytides
Butterflies described in 1866
Butterflies of North America
Butterflies of Central America
Taxa named by Carl Heinrich Hopffer
Butterfly subspecies